Alex Brychta MBE (born January 1956) is a British illustrator. He has collaborated with Roderick Hunt on a series of children books for the Oxford Reading Tree which had an animated spin-off, The Magic Key series. There were originally 30 books in the Oxford Reading Tree, and there are now around 400. They are used by over 80% of British primary schools to help children learn to read, in addition to schools in more than 120 other countries.

Alex Brychta followed in his parents' footsteps and aged 10, his drawings were shown to the Lord Mayor of Hamburg in a public exhibition. In 1968, however, his family moved to England, where he had his first book published in 1972.

In addition to Oxford Reading Tree, Brychta is also the illustrator of Read with Biff, Chip and Kipper (formerly Read at Home), the Wolf Hill series of books and the Time Chronicles series.  He has also written and illustrated several children's books for J M Dent, Franklin Watts, and Oxford University Press.

Brychta was appointed Member of the Order of the British Empire (MBE) in the 2012 New Year Honours for services to children's literature.

Alex now lives in Surrey with wife Dina whom he has two children with, Kelly Brychta and Dylan Brychta.

See also 
Roderick Hunt

References 

Living people
1956 births
English illustrators
Members of the Order of the British Empire